GRIP and coiled-coil domain-containing protein 2 is a protein that in humans is encoded by the GCC2 gene.

The protein encoded by this gene is a peripheral membrane protein localized to the trans-Golgi network. It is sensitive to brefeldin A. This encoded protein contains a GRIP domain which is thought to be used in targeting. Two alternatively spliced transcript variants encoding different isoforms have been described for this gene.

References

Further reading